X-Faktor is a Hungarian television music competition to find new singing talent. Kiss Ramona presented her third series of X-Faktor. The ninth series aired on RTL Klub in 2019. ByeAlex, Laci Gáspár, Peti Puskás remained in the jury in the 9th season. After 2 years Gigi Radics, left X-Faktor, and was replaced by Bogi Dallos. Tibor Ruszó won the competition, the boys category.

Auditions
Open auditions took place in Budapest in March 2019. The judges' auditions started on July in Budapest.

Judges' houses
This year there were no guest speakers, but every mentor would hear the performances of the four categories, then the mentor of that category would automatically bring two contestants to the live broadcasts and the remaining contestants would be assigned to the other three mentors who would select the third lead.

The twelve eliminated acts were:
Boys: Ferenc Bottka Dominik, Alfréd Hadas, Kristóf Markovics
Girls: Zita Antal Melánia, Eszter Bojás, Cintia Ács
Over 25s: Barbara Bujtor, Helbert Shaw, Maria Mamah
Groups: Kalandor zenekar, Inverz Duo, Plan B

Contestants
Key:
 – Winner
 – Runner-Up
 – Third Place

Results summary 
In season nine, the rule from last season remained, four chairs wear place in the studio, which they can sit for, the mentors want to put forward to the next week, the seats on the chair may change during the show. Based on viewers' votes, another four contestants would be able to enter the next live show.
{|
|-
| – mentored by Bogi Dallos (Girls)
|| – Danger zone; Safe
|-
| – mentored by Byealex (Boys)
| – Safe
|-
| – mentored by Peti Puskás (Groups)
| – Eliminated by SMS vote
|-
| – mentored by Laci Gáspár (Over 25s)
|}

Live Shows

Week 1 (16 November)
 Group performance: "Nem elég"
 – Get a chair, safe and go to the next live show

In the first live show, four chairs are placed, and the juries vote at least three yes, the competitors  sit down. If each was full and another competitor has come, and the juries vote at least again three yes, the competitor with the lowest number of votes in the public vote would hand over the chair.

Week 2 (23 November)

 – Get a chair, safe and go to the next live show

In the second live show, three chairs are placed, and the juries vote at least three yes, the competitors sit down. If each was full and another competitor has come, and the juries vote at least again three yes, the competitor with the lowest number of votes in the public vote would hand over the chair.

Week 3 (30 November)
In the first round, there is only a vote and 1 competitor will be eliminated

 – Get a chair, safe and go to the next live show

In the third live show, two chairs are placed, and the juries vote at least three yes, the competitors sit down. If each was full and another competitor has come, and the juries vote at least again three yes, the competitor with the lowest number of votes in the public vote would hand over the chair.

Week 4 (7 December)

 – Get a chair, safe and go to the next live show

Week 4 changes the rules for the chair. In the event tie between the mentors' votes, the spectators' vote will determine whether or not the competitor is allowed to sit on the chair. In the fourth live show, two chairs are placed again, and the juries vote at least three yes, the competitors  sit down. If each was full and another competitor has come, and the juries vote at least again three yes, the competitor with the lowest number of votes in the public vote would hand over the chair.

Week 5 Final (14 December)

 Celebrity performer: USNK and Gigi Radics

Ratings
{| class="wikitable sortable" style="text-align:center"
|-
! scope="col" | Episode
! scope="col" | Air date
! scope="col" | Official rating(millions)
! scope="col" | Weekly rank
|-
! scope="row" | Auditions 1
|  || 1.00 || 2
|-
! scope="row" | Auditions 2
|  || 1.18 || 1
|-
! scope="row" | Auditions 3
|  || 1.23 || 1
|-
! scope="row" | Auditions 4
|  || 1.40 || 1
|-
! scope="row" | Bootcamp 
|  || 1.18 || 1
|-
! scope="row" | Six-chair challenge
|  || 0.93 || 3
|-
! scope="row" | Judges' houses 1
|  || 1.13 || 1
|-
! scope="row" | Judges' houses 2
|  || 0.98 || 2
|-
! scope="row" | Live show 1
|  || 1.10 || 1
|-
! scope="row" | Live show 2
|  || 1.06 || 1
|-
! scope="row" | Live show 3
|  || 0.94 || 2
|-
! scope="row" | Live show 4
|  || 0.87 || 3
|-
! scope="row" | Final
|  || 1.05 || 1
|-

Hungary 09
Television series by Fremantle (company)
2019 Hungarian television seasons